Madison is a city in Morgan County, Georgia, United States. It is part of the Atlanta-Athens-Clarke-Sandy Springs Combined Statistical Area. The population was 4,447 at the 2020 census, up from 3,979 in 2010. The city is the county seat of Morgan County and the site of the Morgan County Courthouse.

The Madison Historic District is one of the largest in the state. Many of the nearly 100 antebellum homes have been carefully restored. Bonar Hall is one of the first of the grand-style Federal homes built in Madison during the town's cotton-boom heyday from 1840 to 1860.

Budget Travel magazine voted Madison as one of the world's 16 most picturesque villages.

Madison is featured on Georgia's Antebellum Trail, and is designated as one of the state's Historic Heartland cities.

History

Early 19th century 
On December 12, 1809, the town, named for 4th United States president, James Madison, was incorporated. Madison was described in an early 19th-century issue of White's Statistics of Georgia as "the most cultured and aristocratic town on the stagecoach route from Charleston to New Orleans." An 1849 edition of White's Statistics stated, "In point of intelligence, refinement, and hospitality, this town acknowledges no superior."

While many believe that William Tecumseh Sherman spared the town because it was too beautiful to burn during his March to the Sea, the truth is that Madison was home to pro-Union Congressman (later Senator) Joshua Hill. Hill had ties with General Sherman's brother in the House of Representatives, so his sparing the town was more political than appreciation of its beauty.

Jim Crow era 
In 1895 Madison was reported to have an oil mill with a capital of $35,000, a soap factory, a fertilizer factory, four steam ginneries, a mammoth compress, two carriage factories, a furniture factory, a grist and flouringmill, a bottling works, a distillery with a capacity of 120 gallons a day, an ice factory with a capital of $10,500, a canning factory with a capital of $10,000, a bank with a capital of $75,000, surplus $12,000, and a number of small industries operated by individual enterprise. One of the carriage factories was owned and operated by prominent African-American businessman and entrepreneur H. R. Goldwire.

Against the backdrop of this Jim Crow-era prosperity, white Madisonians participated in at least three documented lynchings of African Americans. In February 1890, after a rushed trial involving knife-wielding jurors, Brown Washington, a 15-year-old, was found guilty of the murder of a 9-year-old local white girl. After the verdict, though the sheriff with the governor's approval called up the Madison Home Guard to protect Washington, "only three militiamen and none of the officers" responded to the order. Washington was thus easily taken from jail by a posse of ten men organized by a "leading local businessman". Described as "among the best citizens", they promptly handed him over to a mob of 300+ waiting outside the courthouse. From there, he was taken to a telegraph pole behind a Mr. Poullain's residence, allowed a prayer, then strung up and shot, his body mutilated by more than a hundred bullets. Afterwards, in the patriarchal exhibition-style common of southern lynchings, a sign was posted on the telegraph pole: "Our women and children will be protected." His body was not taken down until noon the next day.

According to Brundage's account of the lynching of Brown Washington in Lynching in the New South: Georgia and Virginia, 1880-1930:

In the aftermath, though local and state authorities vowed to thoroughly investigate the lynching as well as the Madison Home Guard's dereliction of duty, just a week later a grand jury was advised by a judge of the superior court of Madison that any investigation would be a waste of time. In addition, the state body charged with investigating the home guard's non-response reported that their absence had been satisfactorily explained and no tribunal would be convened to investigate the matter."

Although the local Madisonian newspaper failed to report on the 1890 extra-judicial murder of Mr. Washington, an even earlier first lynching by Madisonians of a man they similarly pulled out of the old stone county jail appears in the contemporary accounts from the Atlanta Constitution.

In 1919, ten years after the erection of a Confederate memorial one block from the newly built Morgan County courthouse, a third lynching occurred in the dark of night a few days before Thanksgiving. This time, citizens skipped the show-trials altogether, opting to travel to the home of Mr. Wallace Baynes in what one paper of the day called an "arresting party", though no charges against Mr. Baynes were stipulated in the news account. Baynes shot at the party, striking Mr. Frank F. Ozburn of Madison in the head, killing him instantly. In response, the mob outside his home grew to 40-50 men. Despite the arrival of Madison Sheriff C.S. Baldwin, Mr. Baynes was pulled from his home by a rope and shot near the Little River. Afterwards, the sheriff present at the lynching said he could not identify any of the men who came for Mr. Baynes, despite the fact that they arrived in cars and lit up Mr. Baynes' home with the headlights of their vehicles. In an editorial that argued that mobs in the South were no worse than mobs in the North yet condemned future lynchings, the local Madisonian claimed: "There is not now and perhaps will never be, any friction between the races here."

The Confederate monument erected in 1909 by the Morgan County Daughters of the Confederacy one block from the courthouse where Mr. Baynes was not afforded a trial was inscribed in part: "NO NATION ROSE/SO WHITE AND FAIR, NONE FELL SO PURE OF CRIME." In the 1950s the monument was moved to Hill Park, a Madison city property donated by Bell Hill Knight, daughter of Joshua Hill, the aforementioned pro-Union senator who before the Civil War resigned his position rather than support secession. Mrs. Knight, whose husband Captain Gazaway Knight was Commander of the Panola Guards, a Confederate brigade that was organized in Madison, was a staunch member of the Morgan County Daughters of the Confederacy.

Present day 
Madison has one of the largest historic districts in the state of Georgia, with visitors coming to see the antebellum architecture of the homes. Allie Carroll Hart was instrumental in establishing Madison's historical prestige.

According to the Madison Historic Preservation Commission, "The Madison Historic District is listed in the National Register of Historic Places and is Madison's foremost tourist attraction. Preservation of the district and of each property within its boundary provides for the protection of Madison's unique historic character and quality environment. Madison's preservation efforts reflect a nationwide movement to preserve a 'sense of place' amid generic modern development." The Historic Preservation Commission, appointed by Mayor and Council, is charged with protecting the historic character of the district through review of proposed exterior changes.

Geography 
Madison is located in central Morgan County at  (33.588038, -83.472368).

In Madison, the south side of the ridge drains to tributaries of Sugar Creek, which flows southeast to the Oconee River, while the north side drains via Mill Branch to Hard Labor Creek, an east-flowing tributary of the Apalachee River, which continues to the Oconee. The southwest part of the city drains to Little Indian Creek, a tributary of the Little River, which flows to the Oconee north of Milledgeville.

Interstate 20, U.S. Route 129, U.S. Route 441, and U.S. Route 278 pass through Madison. I-20 serves the city from exits 113 and 114, leading east  to Augusta and west  to Atlanta. U.S. 278 runs through the center of the city, leading east  to Greensboro and west  to Covington. U.S. 129/441 run through the city together, leading north  to Athens and south  to Eatonton.

Demographics

2020 census

As of the 2020 United States Census, there were 4,447 people, 1,625 households, and 1,121 families residing in the city.

2000 census
As of the census of 2000, there were 3,636 people, 1,362 households, and 964 families residing in the city. The racial makeup of the city was 48.93% White, 47.83% African-American, 0.08% Native American, 0.99% Asian, 1.10% from other races, and 1.07% from two or more races. Hispanic or Latino of any race were 2.09% of the population.

There were 1,362 households, out of which 32.0% had children under the age of 18 living with them, 44.0% were married couples living together, 22.6% had a female householder with no husband present, and 29.2% were non-families. 25.2% of all households were made up of individuals, and 10.7% had someone living alone who was 65 years of age or older. The average household size was 2.61 and the average family size was 3.11.

In the city, the population was spread out, with 26.1% under the age of 18, 7.4% from 18 to 24, 28.2% from 25 to 44, 22.4% from 45 to 64, and 15.9% who were 65 years of age or older. The median age was 37 years. For every 100 females, there were 84.3 males. For every 100 females age 18 and over, there were 77.9 males.

The median income for a household in the city was $36,055, and the median income for a family was $40,265. Males had a median income of $40,430 versus $21,411 for females. The per capita income for the city was $19,551. About 10.3% of families and 11.6% of the population were below the poverty line, including 14.2% of those under age 18 and 13.3% of those age 65 or over.

Culture and parks 
Madison is home to a handful of art galleries and museums. The Madison-Morgan Cultural Center (MMCC) provides a regional focus for performing and visual arts, plus permanent exhibits including a historical exhibit of Georgia's Piedmont region. The center occupies an elegantly restored 1895 Romanesque Revival building and is located in the heart of Madison's nationally registered historic district. Athens band R.E.M. recorded an MTV Unplugged session at the center in 1991, where they played "Losing My Religion" with the Atlanta Symphony Orchestra.

The Morgan County African American Museum is located in Madison.

Heritage Hall is maintained by the Morgan County Historical Society and has been restored for its architectural and historical significance. The original portion of Heritage Hall was built in 1811, and it received its Greek Revival façade around 1830. The house was a private residence until 1977.

The Madison Artists' Guild has more than 150 members and is a nonprofit organization dedicated to education and the encouragement of artistic endeavors in its members and the community through planned programs and regular gatherings.

There are five parks in the city limits. Wellington, Gilbert, Lambert, and Hill Park are designated for active play, whereas Town Park is designed for events and public gatherings.

Crime 
According to a 2017 crime report produced by the city's planning and development director, property crime rates in Madison are double and triple of nearby Social Circle and Watkinsville, respectively. Violent crime remained steady at a rate of 10 incidents out of a population of 4,034, a rate comparable with Social Circle and Watkinsville. In addition, property crime had decreased in 2016 to a six-year low. The online analytical platform Niche rates Madison's crime a "C" based on violent and property crime rates.

Education 
The Morgan County School District is a charter school system that covers pre-school to grade twelve, and consists of two elementary schools, a middle school, and a high school. The district has 210 full-time teachers and over 3,171 students, with a high school completion rate of 71%. The Superintendent is Dr. James Woodward whose background includes over 12 years serving the Georgia Department of Education in Agricultural and Career and Technical initiatives.

Morgan County Primary School
Morgan County Elementary School 44% students proficient in math, 42% in reading.
Morgan County Middle School: 30% students proficient in math, 42% in reading.
Morgan County High School: 32% students proficient in math, 44% in reading.

In popular culture 
Parts of the 2017 film American Made starring Tom Cruise were shot in the Morgan County Courthouse.
Parts of the opening credits scene from the 1992 film My Cousin Vinny were filmed in Madison.
Significant parts of the 2015 film Goosebumps, starring Jack Black, were filmed in Madison and at the Madison-Morgan Cultural Center.
In Harry Turtledove's final Southern Victory novel Volume 11: In at the Death, Madison was the site of an important climax to the long-running series.
I'll Fly Away (1991–93), an NBC television series starring Sam Waterston as a southern lawyer at the dawn of the civil rights movement, was shot largely in Madison.
The historic mansion Bonar Hall served as President Franklin D. Roosevelt's hospital in HBO's 2005 film Warm Springs.
The 2000 film Road Trip was filmed in Madison.
The 1978 film The Great Bank Hoax starring Ned Beatty, Richard Basehart and Charlene Dallas was filmed in Madison.
Portions of the TV series October Road were filmed in Madison.
Portions of the TV series The Originals''', were filmed in Madison. The show was a spin-off of The Vampire Diaries.Hissy Fit, a novel by Mary Kay Andrews, is set in Madison.
The main character of the webcomic Check, Please!, Eric "Bitty" Bittle, is noted as being from Madison.

 Notable people 
 Benny Andrews, nationally recognized as an artist, teacher, author, activist, and advocate of the arts, grew up in rural Morgan County.
 Raymond Andrews (June 6, 1934 – November 25, 1991), African-American novelist, grew up in rural Morgan County.
 Tookie Brown (born November 22, 1995), professional basketball player
 George Gordon Crawford (August 24, 1869 – March 20, 1936), industrialist, was born in Madison.
 B.J. Elder (born September 4, 1982), former Georgia Tech and professional basketball player
 Monday Floyd, carpenter and Georgia Assemblyman who was harassed, threatened, and attacked by the Ku Klux Klan until he fled to Atlanta
 Oliver "Ollie" Hardy (born Norvell Hardy) (January 18, 1892 – August 7, 1957), comic actor famous as one half of Laurel and Hardy, lived in Madison as a child where his mother owned a hotel called the Hardy House. The Madison-Morgan Cultural Center is a preserved Romanesque Revival schoolhouse housing the room where Oliver Hardy attended first grade.
 Albert T. Harris, World War II naval hero, was born in Madison.
 Allie Carroll Hart (1913–2003), director of the Georgia Department of Archives and History, 1964 to 1982
 Bill Hartman (William Coleman "Bill" Hartman, Jr., March 17, 1915 – March 16, 2006), Washington Redskins running back, started playing American football in Madison.
 Joshua Hill (January 10, 1812 – March 6, 1891), U.S. senator who lived in Madison. During the Civil War, General William Tecumseh Sherman, a friend of Hill, did not burn Madison on his "March to the Sea".
 Eugenius Aristides Nisbet began his practice of law in Madison Georgia, before later being elected as one of the three initial justices of the Supreme Court of Georgia in 1845.
 Brooks Pennington Jr., businessman, philanthropist and politician, operated his father's seed store on Main Street.
 Seaborn Reese (November 28, 1846 – March 1, 1907), politician, jurist and lawyer, was born in Madison. Reese filled the seat for Georgia in the United States House of Representatives during the 47th United States Congress. He was reelected to the 48th and 49th Congresses, serving from December 4, 1882, until March 3, 1887.
 Mark Schlabach, sports journalist, New York Times best-selling author and columnist and reporter for ESPN.com, lives in Madison.
 William Tappan Thompson, humorist and writer who co-founded the Savannah Morning News newspaper in the 1850s, lived in Madison in the 1840s and worked on the city's first newspaper, The Southern Miscellany''.
 Jesse Triplett, lead guitarist with Collective Soul, was born in Madison and attended the Morgan County School System.
 Philip Lee Williams (born January 30, 1950), novelist, poet, and essayist, grew up in Madison.

See also 

 List of municipalities in Georgia (U.S. state)
 National Register of Historic Places listings in Morgan County, Georgia

References

Further reading

External links 

Government

General information
Community Settlement Historical Marker at the Historical Marker Database (HMdb.org)

Madison Historical Marker at Digital Library of Georgia
Madison – Morgan Chamber of Commerce at Madison Studios (madisonstudios.com)
Madison – Morgan County Convention & Visitors Bureau at Madison Studios (madisonstudios.com)
Morgan County Library at Azalea Regional Library System



 
1809 establishments in Georgia (U.S. state)
Cities in Georgia (U.S. state)
Cities in Morgan County, Georgia
County seats in Georgia (U.S. state)

Planned cities in the United States
Populated places established in 1809